The Chicago and North-Western Land Office, now the Wabeno Public Library, is a historic building in Wabeno, Wisconsin, United States. The building was constructed as a land office for the Chicago and Northwestern Railway in 1897 and was one of the first buildings in Wabeno. The Town of Wabeno bought the building in 1923 and later converted it to a library. The library is now the only log library in the state. On December 23, 1993, the building was added to the National Register of Historic Places.

References

External links
Wabeno Public Library
Wisconsin Historical Society property record

Commercial buildings on the National Register of Historic Places in Wisconsin
Victorian architecture in Wisconsin
Commercial buildings completed in 1895
Buildings and structures in Forest County, Wisconsin
Libraries in Wisconsin
National Register of Historic Places in Forest County, Wisconsin